The 49th New Zealand Parliament was elected at the 2008 election. It comprised 122 members, including an overhang of two seats (an increase of one from the 48th Parliament) caused by the Māori Party having won two more electorate seats than its share of the party vote would otherwise have given it. The Parliament served from 2008 until the November .

New Zealand uses the mixed-member proportional (MMP) system to elect its parliaments. Seventy of the members of the 49th Parliament represented geographical electorates: sixteen in the South Island, 47 in the North Island (one more than for the 48th Parliament) and seven Māori electorates. The remaining 52 (increased from fifty by the overhang) were elected from nationwide party vote candidate lists to realise proportionality.

There were 10 resignations leading to Electoral Commission replacement selections for new list candidates from four parliamentary parties. Lockwood Smith was the Speaker in the 49th Parliament.

Electorate boundaries for 49th Parliament
The Representation Commission altered many of the boundaries of New Zealand's parliamentary electorates following the 2006 census; the large growth in population between censuses lead to significant boundary changes, particularly in Auckland, the area around Christchurch and the central North Island. In May 2007, the Representation Commission announced the boundary changes to take effect for the next general election, with the boundaries finalised in September 2007.

The Commission announced the formation of a new electorate in Greater Auckland, bringing the number of geographical constituencies to 70. The new electorate, originally dubbed "Howick" (after the Auckland suburb), would have included parts of the existing Pakuranga, Manukau East and Clevedon electorates.  After Pakuranga electors strongly objected to the proposed changes (which would have seen the inclusion of the population centres Panmure, Point England and Glen Innes into the electorate) the Commission largely reverted proposed changes to the boundaries of the Pakuranga electorate. The Commission opted to alleviate population pressures by moving the Auckland City suburb of Otahuhu into Manukau East. The revised new electorate received the name Botany to reflect its focus on the growing population-centres of Botany Downs–Dannemora. On paper, Botany counts as a safe National seat.

Even though the number of South Island electorates remains fixed, the decline in the population of electorates south of Christchurch resulted in the boundaries of electorates from Invercargill north to Rakaia shifting northwards. The electorates of Aoraki, Otago, Rakaia and Banks Peninsula all gravitated towards Christchurch. In the process:

 Aoraki received the new name of  
 Otago received the new name of Waitaki
 Rakaia received the new name of Selwyn
 Banks Peninsula received the new name of Port Hills

Other electorates in the lower South Island increased substantially in size.

2008 election results
The figures below are based on official results  A decrease of 7 MPs is shown for "Other Parties" because the New Zealand First party of Winston Peters did not win an electorate seat or 5% of the party vote, and hence was not allocated any seats in the new Parliament.

Members of the 49th New Zealand Parliament

New Zealand National Party (58)

New Zealand Labour Party (42)

Green Party of Aotearoa New Zealand (9)

ACT New Zealand (5)

Māori Party (4)

United Future New Zealand (1)

Jim Anderton's Progressive Party (1)

Mana Party (1)

Independent (1)

By-elections during 49th Parliament
There were a number of changes during the term of the 49th Parliament.

Summary of changes during term
Helen Clark resigned in April 2009 to take up a position as Administrator of the United Nations Development Programme. The resulting Mount Albert by-election was won by David Shearer on 13 June 2009.
Michael Cullen resigned in April 2009 to become the deputy chairman of New Zealand Post. He was replaced by the next person on the Labour Party's list, Damien O'Connor.
Richard Worth resigned in June 2009. He was replaced by the next person on the National Party's list, Cam Calder.
Sue Bradford resigned in October 2009. She was replaced by the next person on the Green Party's list, David Clendon.
Jeanette Fitzsimons resigned in February 2010. She was replaced by the next person on the Green Party's list, Gareth Hughes.
Chris Carter expelled from Labour Party caucus amidst expenses scandal in 2010 and, as of October 2010, was expelled from the Labour Party meaning his seat is one as solely an Independent MP.
David Garrett resigned from the ACT caucus in September 2010 and resigned from Parliament shortly after being replaced by Hilary Calvert.
Luamanuvao Winnie Laban resigned in October 2010 to become Assistant Vice-Chancellor (Pasifika) at Victoria University of Wellington. The resulting Mana by-election was won by Kris Faafoi.
Pansy Wong resigned in January 2011 following questions and a Speaker's investigation into her use of Ministerial travel privileges. Her portfolios were transferred to Hekia Parata who was raised to Cabinet to replace her. The resulting Botany by-election was won by Jami-Lee Ross.
Hone Harawira resigned from the Māori Party in February 2011 following a recommendation by the party's Disciplinary and Disputes Committee that the party's National Council expel him. He resigned from Parliament as an Independent MP effective 21 May causing a by-election in Te Tai Tokerau. Harawira announced his intention to run as a candidate for the Mana Party. On 6 July 2011 the results of the official count of votes found Harawira won by a majority of 1117.
Darren Hughes announced his intention to resign in March 2011 following an alleged incident involving him. Louisa Wall became the replacement for Hughes from the List for the remainder of the 49th Parliament.
John Carter announced his resignation from politics in June 2011 in favour of a High Commissioner's post in the Cook Islands; he was replaced as a Minister by Craig Foss. As he resigned within six months of a general election, a by-election does not need to be held in his Northland seat.

Seating plan

As on 5 May 2009 
The chamber is in a horseshoe-shape.

End of term 
The chamber is in a horseshoe-shape.

References

2008 New Zealand general election
New Zealand parliaments